Roderick Solo (born 7 July 2001) is a Samoan
born New Zealand rugby sevens player. 

Solo made his All Blacks Sevens debut at 2022 France Sevens in Toulouse. He was named as a non-travelling reserve for the All Blacks Sevens squad for the 2022 Commonwealth Games in Birmingham.

References

External links 

 Roderick Solo at All Blacks.com

2001 births
Living people
New Zealand international rugby sevens players
New Zealand male rugby sevens players
New Zealand rugby union players
Rugby union wings
Wellington rugby union players
Bay of Plenty rugby union players